Helotropha reniformis, the reniform celaena, is a species of moth in the family Noctuidae (owlet moths). The species was described by Augustus Radcliffe Grote in 1874. It is found in North America.

The MONA or Hodges number for Helotropha reniformis is 9453.

References

Further reading
 Lafontaine, J. Donald & Schmidt, B. Christian (2010). "Annotated check list of the Noctuoidea (Insecta, Lepidoptera) of North America north of Mexico". ZooKeys, vol. 40, 1-239.
 Arnett, Ross H. (2000). American Insects: A Handbook of the Insects of America North of Mexico. CRC Press.

External links
Butterflies and Moths of North America
NCBI Taxonomy Browser, Helotropha reniformis

Noctuinae